Cowper Lake 194A is an Indian reserve of the Chipewyan Prairie First Nation in Alberta, located within the Regional Municipality of Wood Buffalo.

References

Regional Municipality of Wood Buffalo
Indian reserves in Alberta